Woody Chapel is an unincorporated community located in McClain County, Oklahoma, United States. Woody Chapel is located at the junction of State Highways 24 and 39 It is near Dibble and Purcell. Its residents are listed in the local Purcell phone book. The name comes from a General Store and gas station on highway 24. Now it is closed.

Woody Chapel suffered wind damage from a tornado in 1979.

References

Unincorporated communities in McClain County, Oklahoma
Unincorporated communities in Oklahoma